Gore may refer to:

Places

Australia
 Gore, Queensland
 Gore Creek (New South Wales)
 Gore Island (Queensland)

Canada
 Gore, Nova Scotia, a rural community
 Gore, Quebec, a township municipality
 Gore Bay, Ontario, a township on Manitoulin Island

United Kingdom
 Gore Hundred, a historic subdivision of Middlesex
  Kensington Gore, a street in Kensington, West London
Gore House, on Kensington Gore

United States
 Gore, Georgia, an unincorporated community
 Gore, Missouri, an unincorporated community
 Gore, Ohio, an unincorporated community
 Gore, Oklahoma, a town
 Gore, Virginia, an unincorporated community
 Gore Canyon, Colorado
 Gore Creek (Colorado)
 Gore Mountain (New York)
 Gore Mountain (Vermont)
 Gore Range, Colorado
 Goretown, South Carolina, an unincorporated community
 Junction City, Kentucky, formerly known as Gore
"The Gore", southeast Indiana, a nickname for part of the former Northwest Territory ceded from Ohio to Indiana in 1803, originally Dearborn County
 Gore Township, Michigan

Elsewhere
 Gorë, a former municipality in Korçë County, Albania
 Goré, Chad, a town
Roman Catholic Diocese of Goré, Chad
Gore District, Upper Canada, an historical district of Upper Canada, now the province of Ontario, Canada
Gore District, New Zealand, a district in the Southland region of the South Island of New Zealand
 Gore, New Zealand, a town
 Gore, Ethiopia, a town
Gore Island (Baja California), Mexico

People
 Gore (surname), including a list of notable people with the surname
Al Gore (born 1948), American politician and environmentalist
 Gore, family name of the Earls of Arran in the Peerage of Ireland
 Gore baronets, in the Baronetage of Ireland
 Gregor Gore Verbinski (born 1964), American film director, screenwriter, producer and musician
 Gore Vidal (1925–2012), American writer

Arts, entertainment, and media

Fictional places
Gore, a mythical place mentioned in the Arthurian legend, ruled by King Urien and probably based on the historical kingdom of Rheged
 The Gore, a fictional place in J. R. R. Tolkien's The Lord of the Rings

Music
 Gore (band), a Dutch rock band formed in 1985
 Gore (album), 2016 album by Deftones, or the title track
Gore (2020 album), 2020 album by  Lous and the Yakuza
 "Gore", a song by Trippie Redd from his 2018 album Life's a Trip

Other uses in arts, entertainment, and media
 Gore (film), a cancelled biographical film about Gore Vidal
 Gore: Ultimate Soldier, a 2002 first-person shooter video game
The Unseen (novel), a horror-mystery novel by Joseph Citro, also known as The Gore
Splatter film, a horror genre also known as "gore film"
Gore, colloquial term for recordings of graphic violence

Textiles
  Gore (fabrics), a triangular piece of cloth used in dress making or hat making
 Gore-Tex, a fabric made by W. L. Gore and Associates
  W. L. Gore and Associates, maker of Gore-Tex fabrics and other industrial products

Other uses
  Gore (heraldry), a roughly triangular charge upon a shield in a coat of arms
 Gore (road), a narrow, triangular area of land often found at road merges and diverges
  Gore (segment), an (often triangular) sector of a curved surface as used to make globes and balloons
 Gore (surveying), a narrow usually triangular strip of land
 , a British frigate which served in the Royal Navy from 1943 to 1946
  Striking spear, or The Gore, a wrestling attack move used by Rhyno

See also
 Goar (disambiguation)
 Gor (disambiguation)
 Goring (disambiguation)
 Gorr (disambiguation)